China Orient Asset Management Co., Ltd. is a Chinese state-owned enterprise. The company is an asset management company and a merchant bank originated as a bad bank for the Bank of China. The bank received shares from debt-to-equity swap of non-performing loans.

The corporation runs in two major business units since 2006, one for general commercial activities, one for the management of the shares that converted from non-performing loans, which was classified as assets under management.

In 2016 the corporation was re-incorporated as a "company limited by shares": China Orient Asset Management Co., Ltd. from China Orient Asset Management Corporation (COAMC). the National Social Security Fund and the Ministry of Finance were the shareholders.

History
Founded as a bad bank of Bank of China, Orient Asset also received Bank of China's asset management subsidiary Bangxin Asset Management in 2000, which itself was incorporated in 1994 as a subsidiary of BoC Shenzhen branch.

In 2015 the group expanded as a full service financial conglomerate by acquiring the Bank of Dalian.

Subsidiaries
 Doho Data Consulting Company
 Dong Yin Development (Holdings) (100%)
 Wise Leader Assets (100%)
 China Orient Asset Management (International) Holding (100%)
 China Orient Ruichen Capital (40%)
 China Orient Summit Capital International (40%)
 China Orient Summit Capital Special Situations Fund (100%)
 Charming Light Investments (SPV for dim sum bond )
 Bangxin Asset Management (100%)
 Bank of Dalian (39.70%)
 China United Insurance Holding (51.01%)
 Dongxing Securities (58.09%)
  (a Credit rating service provider)

Portfolio companies 
 Baiyin Nonferrous (0.63%)
 Dongbei Special Steel (16.6740%)
 Meishan Iron and Steel (7.02%)
 Shandong Jining Ruyi Woolen Textile (12.24%)
  (via COS Greater China Special Situations Fund for 18.17%)
 Tianjin Pipe Corporation (3.03%)
 Xishan Coal Electricity Group (5.67%)

Former portfolio companies 
 China Kejian Co., Ltd.
 Dongfeng Motor Group (2001–2004)
 Rising Nonferrous Metals

References

External links
 

 
Companies based in Beijing
Investment management companies of China
Financial services companies of China
Government-owned companies of China